Baker is a neighborhood in Denver, Colorado, United States.

Geography

Historic district
The historic district designation was granted in 2000 as Baker Historic District as part of the Historic Preservation effort of the City of Denver. Criteria for designation included historical figures who lived in the neighborhood and many popular architectural styles, with several buildings designed by prominent architects within a period of significance of 1873 to 1937. With small exceptions, the same area designated as a local historic district had been entered into the National Register of Historic Places as South Side–Baker Historic District in 1985. South Side is a name used in the 1880s for a larger area from Cherry Creek to Yale Ave., mostly east of Broadway.

In addition to the historic district, three individually-designated Denver Historic Landmark buildings are within Baker's boundaries: the Coyle/Chase House at 532 W. 4th Ave., home of playwright Mary Chase, the 1st and Broadway Building at 101-115 N. Broadway, and Fire Station No. 11 at 40 W. 2nd Ave.

History
A portion of the neighborhood's riverfront was homesteaded by William and Elizabeth Byers in 1859, just north of where James Beckwourth, a former slave, settled the same year. The first subdivision in Baker was platted along Santa Fe Dr. south of W. Sixth Ave. in 1872, and residential development took off in the 1880s. The part of the neighborhood north of Alameda Ave. was annexed into the city of Denver in 1883. The neighborhood includes hundreds of 19th century brick houses and 39 buildings by locally famous architect William Lang. More than 80 percent of the neighborhood was developed by 1900. In the 1970s the City of Denver named the neighborhood after Baker Junior High School (now Denver Center for International Studies) which had been named for turn of the 20th century University of Colorado president James Hutchins Baker, who never lived in the neighborhood.

Character
In 2020 Baker had 6192 residents from a variety of racial, ethnic and socioeconomic backgrounds. Census racial categories of “race alone or in combination” were white 83.9%, Black or African American 5.9%, Native American 3.3%, Asian 4.8%, Native Hawaiian or other Asian Pacific Islander 0.3%, Other 13.3%. 17.9% of Baker residents identified as Hispanic or Latino. 6.8% of Baker residents were under 18 years old.

Baker's demographic makeup has changed significantly over the last two decades. In 2000, when Baker had 5,810 residents, approximately 54% identified as Latino or Hispanic. In 2010,  population had declined to 4879 and the Latino proportion was about 34%. From 2000 to 2010 the number of households had changed very little, increasing about 1%. From 2010 to 2020 Baker added 1228 housing units, mostly in the form of new apartment buildings, a trend that will continue with the planned redevelopments of Broadway Marketplace and Broadway Station.

The neighborhood is a mix of industrial, residential and commercial properties with the area along I-25 having an industrial character, the area along Broadway consisting mostly of commercial retail and offices, and north of Alameda between Santa Fe and Broadway making up the residential core. South of Alameda Ave. at Broadway is a large retail center with several big box stores and further south is the former Gates Rubber factory complex, site of a major redevelopment project which stalled in the late 2000s. 
It occupies the extreme northwest corner of Baker and is only accessible from outside the neighborhood. Within Baker's residential area are Dailey Park, at W. Ellsworth Ave. and S. Cherokee St., and Hector M. Flores Park, at W. 4th Ave. and N. Galapago St.. Vanderbilt Park East is not yet developed, but is a designated park property within the Broadway Station redevelopment. Baker is served by several bus lines and two light rail stations, Alameda station and I-25 & Broadway station.

References

External links
 Baker Historic Neighborhood Association website
 Denver City Government Website

Neighborhoods in Denver
National Register of Historic Places in Denver
Historic districts on the National Register of Historic Places in Colorado
Houses on the National Register of Historic Places in Colorado
Houses in Denver